One Particular Pioneer is a 2013 Russian comedy film directed by Aleksandr Karpilovsky.

Plot 
The film tells about two boys, Misha and Dima, who are preparing for the birthday of a pioneer organization. They go fishing. Suddenly Misha falls into the river, but was saved by a stray dog, who after that got to the furrier. Now only these two guys can save her. They have to make a difficult choice. They even miss school holiday dedicated to partial directors. Misha and Dima trшed to save a stray dog, Savva, from a keeper of animal shelter by any means, risking to be enclosed at police office. Misha was found missing by his father, as well as Dima. They secretly swam to the illegal shelter of the keeper, who subsequently revealed to be a dangerous criminal. The boys saved Savva and 10 other dogs. Later on, Misha's father regretted his earlier actions and Misha told him that he had learned swimming. Vadim Mikhaylovich agreed to keep the dog. Finally, when the school was engaged in discussion whether Mishka and Dima should be excluded from the organization, the police officer came to school with congratulations for discovering and helping to liquidate a dangerous criminal.

Cast 
 Semyon Treskunov as Mishka Khrustalev
 Egor Klinaev as Dimka Terentyev
 Anfisa Vistingauzen as Lenka Karaseva
 Yuliya Rutberg as Nadezhda Vladimirovna
 Svetlana Ivanova as Svetlana Alekseevna
 Roman Madyanov as Keeper
 Yevgeny Mundum as Vitya Mukhomor
 Raisa Ryazanova as Galina Ivanovna
 Vladimir Zaytsev as Vadim Mikhaylovich Khrustalev
 Irina Lindt as Mishka's Mother

References

External links 
 

2013 films
2010s Russian-language films
Russian comedy films
2013 comedy films